A monkey wrench is a type of adjustable spanner.

Monkey wrench may also refer to:

 Pipe wrench, often incorrectly called a monkey wrench
 "Monkey Wrench" (song), by Foo Fighters, 1997
 Monkeywrench Records, an independent United States–based record label
 "The Monkey Wrench", a 1951 short story by Gordon R. Dickson
 Monkeewrench (released later as Want to Play?), a 2003 novel by author team P. J. Tracy
 Monkeywrench, a fictional G.I. Joe character, member of the Dreadnoks faction of Cobra
 Monkeywrenching, a type of sabotage